Proper Patola is a Single Punjabi and Hindi song sung by Diljit Dosanjh and Badshah (rap). Written by Badshah, the song was directed by Gifty. The music was produced by Badshah and Sachh. The song has been recreated by Badshah for the Bollywood movie Namaste England. The song features Arjun Kapoor and Parineeti Chopra and sung by Badshah and Aastha Gill. The song became an instant hit and is recognized as a party anthem. The music video has more than 305 million views on YouTube.

Creation
Diljit Dosanjh, Badshah and their team worked on composing this song for one year. Badshah wrote the lyrics and composed the music. Due to busy schedule of making and promotion of the Punjabi Movie Jatt & Juliet 2, Diljit hardly had time to work on the song, earlier this song was to be released in 2012 but because of this reason it took longer than its expected time. After the release of the movie, Diljit was ready with the song in less than 2 months.

The music video for the song was shot in Los Angeles.

Release
On August 8, 2013 the song's official video was released worldwide via Sony Music India VEVO's YouTube channel. The song was released on August 9, 2013 at all major online music stores including iTunes.

Namaste England version
Badshah, Aastha Gill composed the lyrics of Diljit Dosanjh. This film stars Arjun Kapoor, Parineeti Chopra, Badshah.

Success
Three weeks after the video's release it passed a million views. On the Punjabi Music TV Channel 9x Tashan this song caught the first position on Top 10 Chart. Proper Patola also hit the first position at iTunes India Chart by passing Honey Singh's Bring Me Back on Aug 23, 2013.

Promotion
Diljit Dosanjh and Badshah decided to promote Proper Patola more than social network and TV, so they decided to premiere the song in movie theaters in major cities of Punjab, including Ludhiana, Amritsar, and Jalandhar.

References

External links
 
 Proper Patola will cement our relationship with Diljit Dosanjh: Sanujeet Bhujabal
 
 

Punjabi-language songs
2013 songs